The K-115 ski jumping hill in Bakuriani, Georgia was built in 1969. There is also a K-90, K-70 and K-45 in Bakuriani. All hills, including the K115, are covered with plastic mattings.

References 

Ski jumping venues in Georgia (country)
Buildings and structures completed in 1969
Buildings and structures in Samtskhe–Javakheti